= Elise Fichtner =

Austrian stage actor

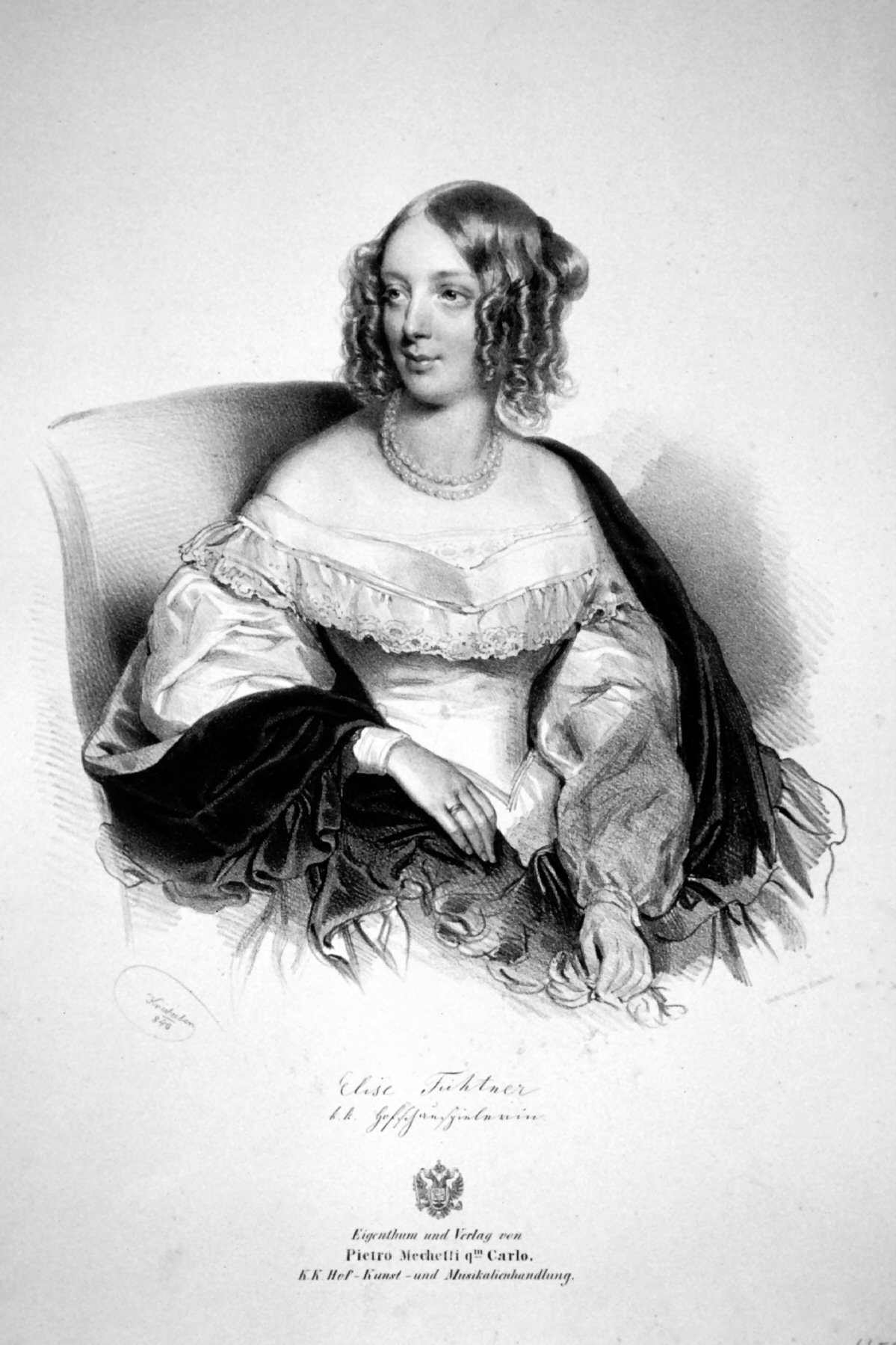
Elise Fichtner

Elise Fichtner (1809-1889), born Elisabeth Wilhelmine Sofie Koberwein, was an Austrian stage actress. She was engaged at the Burgtheater in 1822-1864, where she belonged to the most famed elite actresses of her time and performed heroine-roles, and progressively mother-roles, in romantic dramas. She married actor Karl Fichtner in 1830.
